Oliver's Battery or Olivers Battery may refer to:

 Oliver's Battery, an earthwork and suburb of Winchester, Hampshire, England
 Oliver's Battery (Tresco), an earthwork at the southern tip of Tresco, Isles of Scilly, England
 Oliver's Battery, an earthwork near Old Alresford, Hampshire, England
 Oliver's Battery, an earthwork at Old Basing, Hampshire, England